was a Japanese sculptor and painter.

Life and work

Funakoshi was born in what is now the town of Ichinohe in the Iwate Prefecture in northern Honshū. Later he attended middle school in Morioka where the painter Shunsuke Matsumoto was among his schoolmates. In 1939 Funakoshi joined the Shin Seisaku Kyōkai ("association for new art") and helped to organize its sculpture division. Together with Matsumoto he held a shared exhibition in Morioka in 1941. Both artist remained friends until Matsumoto's early death in 1948.

In 1950 Funakoshi showed the sculpture Azalea at the 14th exhibition of the Shin Seisaku Kyōkai. The sculpture was subsequently bought by the ministry of education. In the same year he converted to Catholicism and his new faith proved to have a profound influence on his work, which started to feature Christian motives. From 1958 to 1962 he created the sculptures Twenty-six Martyrs of Japan and later the Hara-no-Jo (Christian samurai). For the former sculpture he was awarded the Takamura Kōtarō Prize and the pope bestowed the Order of St. Gregory the Great on him in 1964. For the latter sculpture he received the  Nakahara-Teijirō-Prize in 1972.

In addition to his work as an artist Funakoshi worked as a lecturer in his later life as well. After his retirement in 1983 he became an honorary professor at the Tokyo University of the Arts. In 1987 he suffered a stroke, which forced him to switch to his left hand for his future art work. Funakoshi died in 2002 in Tokyo at the age of 89.

Among other well known works of Funakoshi are the sculptures Spring and the Statue of Tatsuko. For Spring he received the Hasegawa-Hitoshi-Memorial-Prize and it was installed on the Heimai bridge in Kushiro in 1977. The Statue of Tatsuko is golden bronze statue located at the shore of Lake Tazawa, where it was unveiled on April 12, 1968.

The sculptor Katsura Funakoshi is his son.

References 
Louis Frédéric: Japan Encyclopedia. Harvard University Press 2002, p. 220

External links 
Funakoshi Yasutake – website of the Iwate Museum of Art

Notes 

Japanese Roman Catholics
Converts to Roman Catholicism
People from Iwate Prefecture
1912 births
2002 deaths
20th-century Japanese sculptors
Catholic sculptors